Dominic Alfred Poleon is an English footballer who plays as a forward for Ebbsfleet United. He played youth football for Chelsea and Southend United before signing for Leeds United in August 2010. Whilst at Leeds he had loan spells with Bury and Sheffield United.

Career

Chelsea and Southend United
Poleon attended Brampton Manor Academy in East Ham. He began his career in football across the city in the junior teams at Chelsea but failed to progress at the Premier League club. He would join Southend United for the later years of his school life and travelled with them on a tour of France in 2009 aged 15 before being signed by Leeds a year later after being identified by Head of Recruitment Steve Holmes.

Leeds United
Poleon joined Leeds in the summer of 2010. He gained good reviews in the youth and reserve teams in his first year at the club. In the following 2011–12 season, Poleon was the leading scorer for the United youth team with 12 goals. He capped his second season at the club by signing a one-year professional contract along with fellow youth prospects Ross Killock and Monty Gimpel.

After scoring for the club's Development Team in a 2–0 friendly match victory over Alfreton Town at North Street on 21 July 2012, Poleon and several other youngsters including Sam Byram, Nathan Turner, Lewis Turner and Monty Gimpel, travelled with the senior team the following week on a pre-season tour of Cornwall and Devon. He scored again against Tavistock in a 6–0 victory and featuring as a substitute in subsequent games versus Bodmin Town and Torquay United as Leeds recorded three wins from three on their summer tour. The tour provided Poleon with the perfect opportunity to demonstrate his competency at a senior level ahead of a make-or-break year.

His performances in further pre-season games would lead to the young striker joining fellow prospect Sam Byram on the fringes of the first team for the start of manager Neil Warnock's first full season in charge as he was assigned the number 26 shirt for the campaign. He made his first team début for Leeds in the first game of the season coming on as a 76th-minute substitute against Shrewsbury Town at Elland Road in the League Cup fixture on 11 August 2012. He would make his league début two weeks later when he replaced Ross McCormack in Leeds' 2–1 win over Peterborough United.

Poleon made his first start for Leeds United in a league game against Nottingham Forest on 22 September after impressing as a substitute in a 2–3 league defeat against Hull City earlier in the week. He marked the occasion with his first professional goal in the 25th minute. Prior to the game against Forest, Neil Warnock had questioned Poleon's work ethic and approach to the game, saying that he risked his career 'fizzling out' if he didn't change his attitude. He likened Poleon's attitude to his former protégé at Crystal Palace, Victor Moses, who would prove to increase his application before joining Premier League side Wigan Athletic in £2.5m deal in 2010 and reigning UEFA Champions League winners Chelsea for a fee of around £9m two years later. The imminent loan signing of another of Warnock's former protégés and Moses' former teammate at Palace, Ryan Hall, would further limit Poleon's first-team opportunities at United as he would look to gain valuable playing experience from a loan spell in the lower leagues.

On 15 October 2012, Poleon and teammate Zac Thompson joined League One strugglers Bury on month-long loan deals. Both youngsters would be working under the newly appointed Bury manager Kevin Blackwell, who had a seventeen-year association with Warnock as player and coach between 1986 and 2003 and had managed Poleon's parent club between 2004 and 2006. He was assigned the number 33 shirt and made his debut for the Shakers in the 1–1 home draw versus Carlisle United. Poleon had hit the post in the game and provided the assist for goalscorer Thompson in the first-half. The energy and commitment of the youngsters lead to instant praise from Blackwell after the game; observing that "the two young lads from Leeds were absolutely out on their feet after that. For them, the warm up matters, every time they train matters, when they travel in – it matters and I'm really pleased with both of them, the whole team."

Poleon scored his first goal for the club in his second game versus Yeovil Town, equalising on the 74th minute mark at Huish Park in a 1–2 defeat. He continued his impressive early form over the following games; adding another assist in a 2–1 victory over Hartlepool United and his second goal in a 1–1 draw at home to Walsall. Poleon got a touch on the ball as it dribbled towards goal, with Poleon getting the final stroke before it nestled into the bottom corner against Portsmouth. On 19 November, Poleon's loan at Bury was extended until 3 January 2013 but he was recalled by his parent club only a day later due to suspensions and injuries. During Poleon's seven league games; the Shakers accumulated eleven points having previously only picked up four from their first ten.

Poleon was recalled by Leeds on 20 November due to injuries and suspensions at his parent club, coupled with his own good form at Bury. On 18 January 2013, Poleon signed a new two-and-a-half-year contract with Leeds.

Poleon joined Yorkshire rivals Sheffield United on loan until the end of the season on 12 February 2013. Blades boss Danny Wilson described Poleon as being "raw and unpredictable but very quick... he can get in behind the back of people and he can get a goal. We just feel he can add a little bit extra from the bench or even start." After playing seven times for Sheffield, Poleon was recalled by Leeds caretaker manager Neil Redfearn, after the departure of Neil Warnock.

Poleon scored his second goal for Leeds at Vicarage Road on the final day of the season in Leeds' 2–1 win against Watford after appearing as an early substitute for the injured Steve Morison. During this match Poleon was involved in a controversial collision in which he appeared to push Ikechi Anya, resulting in him accidentally colliding with goalkeeper Jonathan Bond, and earning himself a yellow card. Bond was rendered unconscious and was stretchered off the pitch with a suspected broken nose. Whilst the push was perceived as cynical by many opposing fans, he later posted on his official Twitter that he did not mean to injure the keeper and stressed he had no malicious intentions.

Poleon scored his first goal of the 2013–14 season on his first start, in a League Cup tie at home to Chesterfield. Poleon's goal proved to be the winner as Leeds won the game 2–1.

Oldham Athletic
On 1 September 2014, in the final hour of transfer deadline day, Poleon signed a two-year contract with Oldham Athletic for an undisclosed fee.

AFC Wimbledon
Poleon signed for AFC Wimbledon on 2 July 2016. He scored his first goals for Wimbledon when he scored twice in an EFL Trophy tie against Swansea City Under-23s on 30 August 2016.

Bradford City
He signed for Bradford City in June 2017 on a two-year deal.

Crawley Town
On 5 July 2018, Poleon agreed to join League Two side Crawley Town on a two-year deal for an undisclosed fee.

Newport County
Poleon's contract at Crawley was cancelled by mutual consent on 2 September 2019 to enable him to join League Two Newport County on the same day until the end of the 2019–20 season. He made his debut for Newport 14 September 2019 in the 2–0 defeat to Northampton Town as a second-half substitute.

On 30 January 2020, Poleon joined National League side Dover Athletic on loan until the end of the season. Poleon was released by Newport County at the end of the 2019–20 season.

Ebbsfleet United
On 9 February 2021, Poleon joined National League South side Ebbsleet United on a free transfer following a successful trial period with the club.

A successful February 2023 where Poleon scored seven goals in seven matches, taking Ebbsfleet fourteen points clear of the team in second position, saw the striker win the National League South Player of the Month award.

Personal life
Poleon was born in England and is of St Lucian descent.

Career statistics

Notes

References

External links

1993 births
Living people
Footballers from the London Borough of Newham
English footballers
English people of Saint Lucian descent
Association football forwards
Chelsea F.C. players
Southend United F.C. players
Leeds United F.C. players
Bury F.C. players
Sheffield United F.C. players
Oldham Athletic A.F.C. players
English Football League players
AFC Wimbledon players
Bradford City A.F.C. players
Crawley Town F.C. players
Newport County A.F.C. players
Dover Athletic F.C. players
Ebbsfleet United F.C. players
National League (English football) players
Black British sportspeople